St Paul's Church, Burnthouse Lane was a church in Exeter, Devon. The church, vicarage and hall were subject to acts of vandalism and arson. The decision was made to redevelop the site to provide social housing.

History

St Paul's was established to serve the new Burnthouse Lane estate built after the Second World War. It was a parish in its own right until it was merged with Heavitree in 1977 to form a new parish.

Clergy

References

External links
 Official website

Exeter
Exeter
Churches in Exeter